Amerigo Cacioni (3 May 1908 – 12 December 2005) was an Italian racing cyclist. He rode in the 1932 Tour de France.

References

External links
 

1908 births
2005 deaths
Italian male cyclists
Place of birth missing
Italian emigrants to Venezuela
People from Tivoli, Lazio
Cyclists from Lazio